Constantin Giurescu (10 August 1875–28 October 1918) was a Romanian historian. In 1914, he became a titular member of the Romanian Academy.

Biography
Giurescu was born in Chiojdu, Buzău County and studied at the Saints Peter and Paul High School in Ploiești. He graduated in July 1898 from the University of Bucharest with a diploma in Philosophy and Letters. He taught history at the Unirea High School in Focșani from 1898 to 1902. In 1900 he met Elena Antonescu (b. 1880), the daughter  of Costache Antonescu, a local merchant, and married her in January 1901.

In 1902–1903 Giurescu was the principal at the Hasdeu High School in Buzău. After a stay in Vienna, he settled in Bucharest, where he taught  at the Cantemir Vodă High School, starting in 1906. In 1909 he joined the faculty at the University of Bucharest. That year he was elected corresponding member of the Romanian Academy, and în 1912 he became titular member of the academy.
 
He died in Bucharest as a result of the 1918 flu pandemic.

There is a bust of Giurescu in Odobești; a school in Chiojdu is named after him.

Works

Notes

1875 births
1918 deaths
People from Buzău County
University of Bucharest alumni
Romanian schoolteachers
Heads of schools in Romania
20th-century Romanian historians
Academic staff of the University of Bucharest
Titular members of the Romanian Academy
Deaths from Spanish flu
Infectious disease deaths in Romania